Warren Zaïre-Emery (born 8 March 2006) is a French professional footballer who plays as a midfielder for Ligue 1 club Paris Saint-Germain.

Early life 
Warren Zaïre-Emery was born in Montreuil, growing up in Île-de-France. His father was also a footballer, having played with the Red Star in Seine-Saint-Denis.

Warren started playing at Aubervilliers as a 4 year old, having to wait a year just to be old enough to take his first license there.

Club career 
Already a standout player in Aubervilliers, Zaïre-Emery was quickly scouted by Paris Saint-Germain, signing with the club from the capital in 2014. In their youth system, Zaïre-Emery always played in categories above his age, impressing his coaches at all levels. During the 2021–22 season, as he had only turned 15, he was the youngest player of the under-19 squad. Despite his young age, Zaïre-Emery  became a key player of the U19s, most notably in December 2021, when he was the standout performer of PSG in the UEFA Youth League: during the last group stage game, helping his team to a 3–2 home win against Club Brugge with a goal and an assist—despite going into half-time with a 2–0 deficit—, narrowly qualifying his team directly to the round of 16.

Still aged only 15, Zaïre-Emery was called by Mauricio Pochettino to the first team that season. Attracting the attention of several other big European clubs while still yet to sign his first professional contract, he joined Jorge Mendes's agency in March 2022. In July, Zaïre-Emery signed his first professional contract with PSG, a three-year deal until 30 June 2025. Under new coach Christophe Galtier, he made his senior debut in a 2–0 friendly win over Quevilly-Rouen, and was included in PSG's preseason tour in Japan, where he was in the starting lineup for a 3–0 win over Urawa Red Diamonds.

On 6 August 2022, Zaïre-Emery made his official debut for PSG as a substitute in a 5–0 league win away to Clermont. His debut at the age of 16 years and 151 days made him the youngest player to appear in an official match for the club, a record which was previously held by El Chadaille Bitshiabu. On 25 October, Zaïre-Emery made his UEFA Champions League debut as a substitute in a 7–2 home victory over Maccabi Haifa. This made him the youngest player to appear in the Champions League for PSG. On 7 January 2023, he made his first start in a 3–1 Coupe de France victory away to Châteauroux, becoming the youngest starter in the club's history. He became the club's youngest starter in Ligue 1 in a 1–0 defeat away to Rennes eight days later. On 1 February, Zaïre-Emery scored his first senior goal coming off the bench to cap off a 3–1 victory against Montpellier; in doing so he became PSG's youngest ever goalscorer, aged 16 years and 330 days. On 14 February, he became the youngest player to start a Champions League knockout game at the age of 16 years and 343 days in a 1–0 loss to Bayern Munich.

International career
Of Martiniquais descent, Zaïre-Emery is a French youth international. In April 2022, he was selected with the France under-17 national team for the UEFA Under-17 Euro. With this 2005 generation, he was the only 2006-born player of the squad. France went on to win the tournament, with Zaïre-Emery scoring two goals.

Style of play
A defensive midfielder with a decent physique and remarkable technical abilities, Zaïre-Emery is both good at winning the ball and launching the plays, providing structure to its team plays, giving balance to the midfield.

Good at reading the game, he is described as a player with a very mature personality on the pitch while still in his teenage years, able to often take his responsibilities but still maintaining a calm and disciplined attitude.

Career statistics

Honours
France U17
UEFA European Under-17 Championship: 2022
Individual

 Titi d'Or: 2022

References

External links

2006 births
Living people
Black French sportspeople
French people of Martiniquais descent
Footballers from Seine-Saint-Denis
Sportspeople from Montreuil, Seine-Saint-Denis
French footballers
France youth international footballers
Association football midfielders
Ligue 1 players
FCM Aubervilliers players
Paris Saint-Germain F.C. players